Laugh Tracks is the debut studio album by American hardcore punk band Knocked Loose, released on September 16, 2016. The album was produced by Will Putney, producer and guitarist for the bands END and Fit For An Autopsy, in Belleville, New Jersey after a friend showed Knocked Loose's previous work to him and he gained a desire to produce their album.

Reception

The album received largely positive reviews.

Track listing

Personnel
Knocked Loose
Bryan Garris – lead vocals
Isaac Hale – lead guitar, backing vocals
Cole Crutchfield – rhythm guitar, backing vocals
Kevin Otten – bass
Kevin "Pacsun" Kaine – drums
Production

 Will Putney - production, engineering, mixing

Additional Personnel

 Tim Cayem - photography
 Billy Collier - photography
 Evan Dell - photography
 Errick Easterday - photography
Dallas Garris - guest vocals on "The Rain"
Brendan Murphy - guest vocals on "Billy No Mates"
 Danielle Otrakji - artwork
 Michael Silvestri - photography
 Matthew Vincent - photography

References 

2016 debut albums
Knocked Loose albums
Pure Noise Records albums
Albums produced by Will Putney